Eberlanzia is a genus of daesiid camel spiders, first described by Carl Friedrich Roewer in 1941.

Species 
, the World Solifugae Catalog accepts the following two species:

 Eberlanzia benedicti Delle Cave & Simonetta, 1971 — Somalia
 Eberlanzia flava Roewer, 1941 — Namibia

References 

Arachnid genera
Solifugae